Myurellopsis joserosadoi is a species of sea snail, a marine gastropod mollusc in the family Terebridae, the auger snails.

Description

Distribution
This marine species occurs off Madagascar.

References

 Bozzetti L. (2001) Quattro nuove specie (Neogastropoda: Buccinidae, Marginellidae, Terebridae) dal Mozambico. Malacologia Mostra Mondiale 33: 13–16

Terebridae
Gastropods described in 2001